Hannah Bussiere Kim (born October 3, 1996), better known by her stage name Luna Li, is a Korean-Canadian Toronto-based singer, songwriter, multi-instrumentalist, and producer. During the early months of the COVID-19 pandemic, Kim rose to prominence after a series of videos of her home-performed multi-instrumental jam sessions, featuring her playing the harp, keyboard, guitar, and violin, became viral on social media.

Kim began writing music as Veins (stylized all uppercase), and released the record Moon Garden in 2015. As Luna Li, she self-released her debut extended play Opal Angel in 2017. After signing to AWAL Recordings and In Real Life, she released the jams extended play, a compilation of the viral jam sessions she composed during the pandemic, in 2021. Her debut record as Luna Li, Duality, was released on AWAL (Canada) and In Real Life (in the rest of the world) in 2022.

Early life
Kim was born and raised in Toronto, Ontario. She is of Korean-Canadian heritage and cites her background as a major influence on her songwriting.

Kim grew up with classical training in piano and violin, eventually also becoming proficient in harp, electric guitar, bass, and drums. She attended Classical Music Conservatory in Toronto, where her mothers are co-directors. She originally attended McGill University in Montreal to study violin, but dropped out after a semester to pursue her own songwriting and to start her own rock band in the Toronto music scene. According to Kim, “When I was first starting out, I thought, ‘Rock and roll is cool, the violin is not.’”

Career

2014–2017: Veins 
In 2014, Kim started the garage rock group Veins, the name of which came from a poem written during high school.  After returning from Montreal to Toronto in 2015, she concurrently attended Seneca College's one-year Independent Music Production program, graduating in 2016. While Veins was initially conceived as a personal project, the group grew into a six-member live band that performed at local venues in Toronto and Montreal. In May 2015, the group's debut album Moon Garden was released on Bandcamp. Though they had not reached out to media, the record received a warm reception from press and reviewer outlets. In January 2017, they played their last show under the name Veins. According to Kim, the group had intended to change their name since 2016, partly since “everyone thought Veins would be like a metal or a dark hard rock band, which it wasn't.” She and her bandmates eventually decided on ‘Luna Li’, which fit the natural imagery and themes in her songwriting and production.

2017–present: Luna Li 
As Luna Li, Kim self-released her first EP, Opal Angel, in 2017. In February 2020, Kim released a new song titled "Trying". Kim released another new song, "Afterglow", in August 2020. In February 2021, Kim released her second EP, titled "Jams EP". Kim released a new song titled "Cherry Pit" in March 2021. Kim's next single, "Alone But Not Lonely", was released in May 2021.

In September and October 2021, Kim embarked on a tour opening for Japanese Breakfast.

Kim released her debut album Duality, in 2022 to positive reviews. She followed it up later in the year with the EP Jams 2.

She toured with Wolf Alice, opening for them in fall 2022, before embarking on a headline tour.

Discography

Albums

Duality (2022)

EPs

Opal Angel (2017)

Jams EP (2021)

References

External links 
 Official website
 Luna Li at Bandcamp
 Veins at Bandcamp
  – published by KEXP

Canadian people of Korean descent
Living people
1996 births